Binnie Dunlop (3 August 1874 – 15 July 1946) was a Scottish medical doctor and advocate of eugenics.

Dunlop, the son of a Glasgow doctor, studied medicine at Glasgow University, graduating M.B. (1898) and Ch.B. However, he never practiced medicine, instead studying social and economic questions. He joined the Malthusian League in 1910, and was probably the author of the League's 1913 pamphlet Hygienic Methods of Birth Control. He held office in the Malthusian League as Honorary Secretary and Treasurer, and was editor of The Malthusian from 1918 to 1921.

Works
 National happiness under individualism. An explanation and solution of the poverty and riches problem, 1909
 (anon.) Hygienic methods of family limitation, 1913
 'Over-population as a cause of war', in Eden and Cedar Paul, eds., Population and Birth-control: a symposium, 1917

References

1874 births
1946 deaths
19th-century Scottish medical doctors
Scottish eugenicists